The Newark Legal Center, also known as One Riverfront Center, is an office building in Newark, New Jersey located along the banks of the Passaic River and connected by a skywalk over Raymond Boulevard to Gateway Center and Penn Station. Originally developed by the Port Authority of New York and New Jersey, the twenty story tower contains condominium and rental office space geared to the legal profession.

Land between the tower and the riverfront in the shadow of the nearby Dock Bridge, will be incorporated into a Newark Riverfront Park.

See also

List of tallest buildings in Newark
Penn Plaza East
Government Center (Newark)
List of tallest buildings in New Jersey

References

Skyscraper office buildings in Newark, New Jersey
Port Authority of New York and New Jersey